Phenacobrycon henni is a species of characin endemic to Ecuador, where it is found in the Vinces River basin.  It is the only member of its genus.

References

Characidae
Monotypic fish genera
Fish of South America
Fish of Ecuador
Fish described in 1914